Josh Gilbert may refer to:

 Josh Gilbert (musician), former bass guitar player for As I Lay Dying
 Josh Gilbert (filmmaker) (born 1962), screenwriter and documentary filmmaker